Harry Budgen (1 April 1879 – 13 March 1944) was an English cricketer. He played three first-class matches for Surrey between 1904 and 1909.

He died in the Royal Earlswood Institution for Mental Defectives.

See also
 List of Surrey County Cricket Club players

References

External links
 

1879 births
1944 deaths
Cricketers from Reigate
English cricketers
Surrey cricketers